AEK Korakou is a Cypriot association football club based in Korakou, located in the Nicosia District. It has 1 participation in Cypriot Fourth Division.

References

Football clubs in Cyprus
Association football clubs established in 1999
1999 establishments in Cyprus